Western Sierra Law School (WSLS) is a private law school originally located in San Diego and recently relocated to North San Diego County in Oceanside, California. Western Sierra Law School was founded in 1979 and offers an affordable and accessible option to those looking to study the law, earn a Juris Doctor (J.D.) degree and qualify to sit for the California Bar Exam.

Western Sierra Law School offers a part-time, evening, 4 year J.D. program that is designed to accommodate working professionals. Students attend classes 2-3 nights per week, 3–4 hours per night, typically beginning at 6:30pm. The first year consists of a comprehensive study of Contracts, Torts, and Criminal Law, after which the student is qualified to sit for the First-Year Law Students' Exam (FYLSE) also known as the Baby Bar administered by the State Bar of California. Students must pass the FYLSE within three administrations, or otherwise be exempt, to receive credit for all law study completed to date. While concurrently working to pass the FYLSE, and after passing, students continue their study in years 2, 3, and 4 of all subjects tested on the CA Bar Exam and electives/clinical education to explore areas of interest. Western Sierra Law School has small class sizes averaging 10 students to 1 faculty member.

State Bar of California Registration
Western Sierra Law School is registered with the State Bar of California, Committee of Bar Examiners (CBE) as an unaccredited fixed-facility law school and is authorized by the CBE to confer a Juris Doctor (J.D.) degree on all graduates of its J.D. Program.

The Committee of Bar Examiners (CBE) of the State Bar of California has given degree granting authority to Western Sierra Law School. Upon completing the J.D. Program, the student earns a Juris Doctor (J.D.) degree and satisfies the legal education requirement for admission to the State Bar of California. Upon passing the California Bar Exam and meeting all the admission requirements of the State Bar of California, the successful student may become licensed to practice law in California.

Open Admissions Policy 
Western Sierra Law School has an open admissions policy, meaning that any applicant who satisfies the pre-legal education requirements, appears to have a good moral character and has a passion to study the law can be admitted to the J.D. program. The LSAT is not a requirement of admission. Western Sierra Law School believes in providing access to affordable legal education to all.

First-Year Law Students' Examination (Baby Bar) 
Students who are enrolled in Western Sierra Law School's J.D. Program must pass the First-Year Law Students' Examination (FYLSE) also known as the Baby Bar as part of the State Bar of California's requirements to qualify to take the California Bar Exam, unless exempt as a transfer student from an accredited law school. Students qualify to take the FYLSE after successfully completing their 1L year consisting of Contracts, Torts, Criminal Law.

Alumni 
Western Sierra Law School's alumni are successful in diverse practice areas and industries throughout the United States and around the world. Western Sierra Law School's alumni are distinguished by their leadership, commitment to service and willingness to mentor and support current students and recent graduates. Many alumni are licensed with the State Bar of California to practice law and others use their Juris Doctor degrees in business and to advance their careers. Western Sierra Law School builds and maintains lifelong relationships with all of their students and alumni to support them in serving their communities.

References

External links
 

Law schools in California
Universities and colleges in San Diego
Educational institutions established in 1979
1979 establishments in California
Private universities and colleges in California